John Wyatt may refer to:

John Wyatt (baseball) (1935–1998), baseball player
John Wyatt (cricketer), New Zealand cricketer
John Wyatt (inventor) (1700–1766), joint inventor of roller spinning
John Wyatt (shortstop) (born 1947), 1st round pick of the L.A. Dodgers in the 1965 draft
John Wyatt (writer) (1925–2006), writer and first Ranger to the Lake District National Park in England
John Wyatt (surgeon) (1825–1874), English army surgeon
John Wyatt (bishop) (1913–2004), bishop of the Episcopal Diocese of Spokane

See also
Jonathan Wyatt (born 1972), long-distance runner from New Zealand